The 2001 USL Premier Development League season was the 7th PDL season. The season began in April 2001 and ended in August 2001.

Westchester Flames finished the season as national champions, beating Calgary Storm 3-1 in the PDL Championship game. Calgary Storm finished with the best regular season record in the league, winning 18 out of their 20 games, suffering no losses, and finishing with a +38 goal difference.

Changes from the 2000 season

Name changes 
 The Colorado Comets changed their name to the Denver Cougars.
 The Colorado Springs Stampede changed their name to the Colorado Springs Ascent
 The Dayton Gems changed their name to the Dayton Gemini.
 The Miami Tango changed their name to the Miami Strike Force.
 The Texas Rattlers (formerly of the USISL D-3 Pro League) changed their name to the Texas Spurs.
 The Twin Cities Tornado changed their name to the Twin Cities Phoenix.

New teams 
11 teams were added for the season, including 8 expansion teams:

Went on hiatus 
 The Wisconsin Rebels went on hiatus for the season, and would return in 2002.

Folded 
11 teams folded before the season:
 Abbotsford 86ers Select
 Alabama Saints
 Broward County Wolfpack
 Central Jersey Riptide
 Chicago Sockers
 Lexington Bluegrass Bandits
 Nevada Zephyrs
 New Brunswick Brigade
 Rockford Raptors
 South Florida Future
 Willamette Valley Firebirds

Standings

Central Conference

Great Lakes Division

Heartland Division

Mid-South Division

Eastern Conference

Northeast Division

Southeast Division

Western Conference

Rocky Mountain Division

Northwest Division

Southwest Division

Playoffs

Third place game

References

2001
4
2001 in Canadian soccer